"Rewind" is the fourth single from Welsh rock band Stereophonics' fifth album, Language. Sex. Violence. Other? (2005). It was released in November 2005 and reached number 17 on the UK Singles Chart.

Music video
The Music video picks up where the video for 'Devil' left off, with singer Kelly being let out of the trunk of his kidnappers' car. It is revealed to be a set, and the car is simply driving along in front of a moving screen. Kelly then walks on a treadmill in a studio made up of sets from the previous videos of "Dakota", "Superman" and "Devil".

Track listings
CD1
 "Rewind"
 "Hammerhead"

CD2
 "Rewind"
 "Ooh La La" (Goldfrapp cover from Live Lounge with Jo Whiley on Radio 1)
 "Maybe Tomorrow" (live)

7-inch
 "Rewind"
 "Superman" (MHC remix)

Charts

References

Stereophonics songs
2005 singles
2005 songs
Songs written by Kelly Jones
UK Independent Singles Chart number-one singles
V2 Records singles